Ordgarius magnificus, the magnificent spider, is a bolas spider in the family Araneidae. It is endemic to forests along the Australian east coast.

Description
Females are up to 14 mm long and almost as wide; males reach only 2 mm. Females are creamy-white with a pattern of pink and yellow spots on the abdomen, and a crown of white and reddish tubercles on the head.

Habits
They live in trees or tall shrubs, rarely less than 2 m above the ground. The easiest way to find them is to search for clusters of large, brown egg-sacs suspended among foliage; the spider will be found nearby, at day sheltering in a retreat made from rolled leaves and silk.

Like all bolas spiders, the female attracts male moths with an airborne pheromone. Once a moth approaches, the spider senses it coming due to vibration sensitive hairs on its outstretched legs. It is then caught with a sticky globule that is swung at the prey.

The egg-sacs are up to 5 cm long; one spider produces up to nine sacs per season, each with several hundred eggs.

References

External links
 Description and pictures

Araneidae
Spiders of Australia
Spiders described in 1897
Taxa named by William Joseph Rainbow